The 1975 Madison Dukes football team was an American football team that represented Madison College (now known as James Madison University) during the 1975 NCAA Division II football season as a member of the Virginia College Athletic Association (VCAA). Led by fourth-year head coach Challace McMillin, the Dukes compiled a record of 9–0–1, with a mark of 5–0 in conference play, and finished as VCAA champion.

Schedule

References 

Madison
James Madison Dukes football seasons
College football undefeated seasons
Madison Dukes football